Love or Perish is the twelfth album from Arthur Loves Plastic and was released in 2005.

Release notes
"It's a jungle out there!" features remixes of The Tidbits and Michelle Swan, as well as vocals by Lisa Moscatiello and Heather Heimbuch.

Track listing

Vocals for the track "My Heart" recorded live at 49 West, Annapolis, Maryland.

Personnel
Recorded by Bev Stanton in the Flamingo Room, Silver Spring, MD.

Additional musicians
Lisa Moscatiello - Vocals (1, 6, 8, 11)
Mental Anguish - Loops (2, 10) *
Electroearwig - Loops (3) *
Scott Carr - Loops (4) *
Francine Machetto - Vocals (7)
Omnitechnomatrix - Loops (8) *
Heather Heimbuch - Vocals (10)
Heather Heimbuch - Additional vocals (13)

* Remixed for The Tapegerm Collective

References

Arthur Loves Plastic albums
2005 albums